Helmut Freitag (born July 1960) is a German pianist, organist, conductor and academic teacher.

Education 
Born in Bad Kreuznach, Freitag studied church music, music school (state examination in history and music) and orchestral conducting (diploma with distinction) in Saarbrücken, Düsseldorf and Geneva. His teachers were André Luy, Lionel Rogg, Jean Micault, Hans Drewanz and Hartmut Schmidt.

Career 
From 1988 to 1991, Freitag directed the music school of the district of Kaiserslautern. Since 1989, he has directed the Kaiserslautern Chamber Orchestra. With this orchestra, he has performed in the US, Scandinavia, Switzerland and Italy. On Easter Monday 1991, he became district cantor of the Protestant deaneries of Kaiserslautern and Otterbach. In 2001, he was appointed Kirchenmusikdirektor. Also, since 1991, he has held a teaching position for vocal correpetition at the Hochschule für Musik und Darstellende Kunst Mannheim. In 2002, he was appointed University Music Director of the Saarland University. In 2006, he was awarded the cultural prize of the city of Bad Kreuznach. In 2007, the Saarland University appointed him  of musicology.

Freitag is the initiator of the carillon in the Kaiserslautern Collegiate Church, which was installed in 2009 and, with 47 bells, is one of the largest instruments of its kind in Germany. He has performed his solo organ concerts in almost all European countries.

In 2017, Freitag was awarded a Doctorate (Dr. phil.) with the dissertation Komponisten der Naheregion:Gerhard Fischer-Münster, Fridel Grenz, Magdalene Schauss-Flake,  Dieter Wellmann. Studien zur regionalen Kirchenmusik unter besonderer Berücksichtigung der Werke für Orgel.

References

External links 
 
 Short bio on the website of the University of Saarland
 

German classical organists
German male organists
20th-century German conductors (music)
Academic staff of Saarland University
1960 births
Living people
People from Bad Kreuznach
Male classical organists